An Châu may refer to several places in Vietnam, including:

An Châu, An Giang, a township and capital of Châu Thành District, An Giang Province
An Châu, Bắc Giang, a township and capital of Sơn Động District
An Châu, Thái Bình, a commune of Đông Hưng District
An Châu, a former commune of Hải Dương
An Châu, a former commune of Sơn Động District